The Apple Dumpling Gang is a 1975 American comedy-Western film directed by Norman Tokar. The plot is about a slick gambler named Russell Donovan (Bill Bixby) who is duped into taking care of a group of orphans who eventually strike gold. The film was produced by Walt Disney Productions.

The film is based on the 1971 novel of the same name by Jack M. Bickham. Don Tait wrote the screenplay. The so-called "Apple Dumpling Gang" are named after their favorite American dessert treat, the apple dumpling. It is also known as being the first film to feature the comedy duo of Don Knotts and Tim Conway. Knotts and Conway developed different styles of pulling off their comedy; Conway's characters were usually the less intelligent of the two, which made Knotts usually the brains of the group, though they were both equally inept. Paul J. Smith and Buddy Baker composed the music for it and its 1979 sequel, The Apple Dumpling Gang Rides Again. The song "The Apple Dumpling Gang", as heard in the opening and closing credits, was composed by Shane Tatum and was sung/performed by Randy Sparks and The Back Porch Majority.

Plot
Set in the Wild West in the year 1879, a slick gambler named Russell Donovan (Bill Bixby) comes to the town of Quake City en route to open a casino in New Orleans. In Quake City, Donovan meets his old associate, John Whintle. Whintle is leaving for San Francisco that night and asks Donovan to sign for valuables coming in on tomorrow’s stagecoach. Donovan accepts a down payment and promises to pick up the valuables. The next day, Donovan realizes he has been duped into taking care of three little orphans, Bobby, Clovis, and Celia Bradley. The stagecoach driver Magnolia "Dusty" Clydesdale (Susan Clark) explains that Whintle is in fact the children’s relative and their de facto legal guardian. With their relative gone and Donovan promising to care for the "valuables", they are now wards of Donovan.

The town's sheriff, barber, Justice of the Peace, and judge Homer McCoy (Harry Morgan) tells Donovan that he is legally obligated unless he can have someone else take custody of the children. The children inadvertently cause Donovan much grief by offending all prospective new guardians. The Bradleys wreak havoc in Quake City while riding in an old mine cart destroying much private property. The town’s citizens demand that Donovan pay for the damages, losing him most of his funds for his trip to New Orleans.

As soon as Donovan arrived in Quake City, he is the target of the "Hashknife Outfit". The Outfit consists of two ne'er-do-well former members of the Stillwell Gang, Amos Tucker (Tim Conway) and Theodore Ogelvie (Don Knotts). They were once very threatening, until they were ousted by their former boss, Frank Stillwell (Slim Pickens), for shooting him in the leg. Amos and Theodore continuously try to rob Donovan during his stay in town to miserable results.

Bobby, Clovis, and Celia decide to help their guardian make money by going to the gold mine that they inherited. They come across Amos and Theodore at their hideout and become acquainted. They direct the kids to the mine after mistaking them for a posse. Despite the gold veins drying up years previously, the Bradley children end up finding a massive gold nugget. This incentivizes many people to adopt the children as it would give them access to the gold. Fearing that the people would not have the children's best interests at heart, Donovan has arranged a sham marriage with Dusty so she can keep custody of the Bradley children while he goes to New Orleans. However, things become complicated when Whintle returns. Whintle has heard of the gold and schemes to get the children back. His attorney has a court order demanding immediate return of the Bradleys. McCoy is forced to adhere to Whintle’s demands.

At the same time, Amos and Theodore attempt to steal the Bradleys' gold from the local bank and escape to Mexico. The Hashknife Outfit proves unsuccessful when they try to enter the skylight and wrap themselves up in their rope used for rappelling down. McCoy finds them guilty of attempted robbery and sentences them to hang to scare them out of town. The two men flee to their hideout.

The Stillwell Gang enters town and plans to steal the nugget. Frank impersonates a priest to gain more information about the transportation of the gold from Colonel T.R. Clydesdale (David Wayne). Frank is able to coerce Colonel Clydesdale into disclosing the time and place the nugget will be moved. The children, who have grown attached to Donovan and Dusty, go to Theodore and Amos and give them permission to steal the gold. If the gold goes missing, Whintle will have no more desire for the children and will return custody.

The next day, the Stillwell Gang enters the bank and takes the nugget. Simultaneously, the kids help the Hashknife Outfit rob the bank. Amos and Theodore are recognized by Frank and are almost killed. They are saved when one of the Stillwell Gang starts a shootout with the lawmen and distracts Frank. Frank decides to leave the gold and escape, taking Celia as a hostage. Donovan saves her from Stillwell with the help of Dusty and they realize their love for one another and embrace. Amos and Theodore retreat to the bank's safe to escape gunfire. Their dynamite is shot by one of the townsfolk, obliterating the bank and the gold nugget gets blown into many smaller nuggets. Whintle renounces his guardianship and leaves town. Stillwell’s bounty is awarded to Donovan, giving him enough money for his casino in New Orleans. He instead buys a ranch for himself, Dusty, and the Bradley children. While on their way to the ranch, a reformed Amos and Theodore catch up with the newfound family asking for work as farmhands, to which Donovan agrees.

Cast

 Bill Bixby as Russell Donovan
 Susan Clark as Magnolia Dusty Clydesdale
 Don Knotts as Theodore Ogelvie
 Tim Conway as Amos Tucker
 David Wayne as Col. T.R. Clydesdale
 Slim Pickens as Frank Stillwell
 Harry Morgan as Homer McCoy
 John McGiver as Leonard Sharpe
 Don Knight as John Wintle
 Clay O'Brien as Bobby Bradley
 Brad Savage as Clovis Bradley
 Stacy Manning as Celia Bradley
 Dennis Fimple as Rudy Hooks
 Pepe Callahan as Clemons
 Iris Adrian as Poker Polly
 Fran Ryan as Mrs. Stockley
 Bing Russell as Herm Dally
 James E. Brodhead as The Mouthpiece
 Jim Boles as Easy Archie
 Olan Soule as Rube Cluck
 Tom Waters as Rowdy Joe Dover
 Dawn Little Sky as Big Foot
 Joshua Shelley as Broadway Phil
 Richard Lee-Sung as Oh So
 Arthur Wong as No So
 Dick Winslow as Slippery Sid
 Bill Dunbar as Fast Eddie
 Wally Berns as Cheating Charley

Reception
The film was a hit at the box office, earning $13.5 million in theatrical rentals.

Roger Ebert of the Chicago Sun-Times gave the film two-and-a-half stars out of four and wrote that the film was "in a lot of ways ... a throwback to the Disney productions of two or three years ago, a period of overwhelming banality in the studio's history. More recently, Disney has given us some genuinely inventive entertainments, especially Escape to Witch Mountain and Island at the Top of the World. With The Apple Dumpling Gang, we're back to assembly line plots about the adventure of squeaky-clean kids". Gene Siskel of the Chicago Tribune gave the film one star out of four and called it "the latest piece of treacle from the Walt Disney sitcom kitchen. The recipe is well-known: Mix smiling moms and pops with the dash of villains, fold in saccharine children, and beat with slapstick. The resulting cinematic mush is so predictable, it's a wonder that more youngsters don't tell the Disney folks to 'bake off'". Richard Eder of The New York Times called it "as cheerful and indistinguishable as rice pudding". Variety called the film "an engaging gentle-humored comedy melodrama ... Don Tait's screenplay based on the book by Jack M. Bickham would benefit by some sharp editing of certain Knotts-Conway routines but otherwise picture generally is a fast-paced situation caper". Kevin Thomas of the Los Angeles Times called it "a pleasant and funny Disney family comedy" that was "a bit long but amiable enough to get away with overstaying its welcome". Gary Arnold of The Washington Post called it "the summer's second consecutive stale confection from the Disney organization, whose comedy formulas are solely in need of rejuvenation".

Home media
In October 1980, it became one of the first Disney movies to be released on videocassette. Both The Apple Dumpling Gang and its sequel, The Apple Dumpling Gang Rides Again, have been released on Disney DVD in the United States. In the United Kingdom, only the original film has been made available on DVD.

Sequel and TV series
In 1979, Knotts and Conway reprised their roles in the sequel The Apple Dumpling Gang Rides Again. Bill Bixby, Susan Clark, and the rest of the cast did not appear. Harry Morgan was the only other member of the cast to appear in the sequel, although he plays a different character.

In January 1982, Disney aired Tales of the Apple Dumpling Gang, a television film remake starring John Bennett Perry in the Bixby role, Ed Begley Jr. in the Conway role and Arte Johnson in the Knotts role. One year later saw the premiere of a television series, Gun Shy, with a completely different cast, including Barry Van Dyke in the Bixby role. Six episodes were produced.

References

External links

 
 
 
 
 
 

1975 films
1970s children's comedy films
1970s Western (genre) comedy films
American children's comedy films
Films about the California Gold Rush
Films scored by Buddy Baker (composer)
Films based on American novels
Films based on children's books
Films directed by Norman Tokar
Films set in 1879
Films shot in Bend, Oregon
Walt Disney Pictures films
American Western (genre) comedy films
Films produced by Bill Anderson (producer)
1975 comedy films
1970s English-language films
1970s American films